Donald Gibson may refer to:
Donald Gibson (architect) (1908–1991), City architect for Coventry from 1938 to 1954
Donald E. Gibson, American academic administrator and author
Don Gibson (1928–2003), American songwriter and country musician
Don Gibson (footballer, born 1929), English footballer
Don Gibson (Australian footballer) (1908–1995), Australian rules footballer
Don Gibson (ice hockey) (born 1967), retired Canadian ice hockey player
Don Gibson (Home and Away), a fictional character on the Australian soap opera Home and Away

See also
Gibson (surname)
Dan Gibson (disambiguation)